Hardware stores (in a number of countries, "shops"), sometimes known as DIY stores, sell household hardware for home improvement including: fasteners, building materials, hand tools, power tools, keys, locks, hinges, chains, plumbing supplies, electrical supplies, cleaning products, housewares, tools, utensils, paint, and lawn and garden products directly to consumers for use at home or for business.  Many hardware stores have specialty departments unique to its region or its owner's interests. These departments include hunting and fishing supplies, plants and nursery products, marine and boating supplies, pet food and supplies, farm and ranch supplies including animal feed, swimming pool chemicals, homebrewing supplies and canning supplies.  The five largest hardware retailers in the world are The Home Depot, Lowe's (both in the United States), Kingfisher of the United Kingdom, Obi of Germany, and Leroy Merlin of France.

United States

Larger hardware stores may sell small amounts of building supplies including lumber, flooring, roofing materials and fencing. Such stores are often referred to as home-improvement centers or home centers.

There may be fewer hardware stores in the U.S. now than in years past, but according to the U.S. Census Bureau, there were still 14,300 hardware stores in the U.S. in 2005, employing on average 10 employees each. Even in the face of competition from large chain stores (commonly referred to as big-box or destination hardware stores, e.g., The Home Depot, Lowe's and Menards) new hardware stores in the U.S. are still opening all the time.

In the U.S. there are four major nationwide wholesale suppliers to hardware stores. All four report more than $1 billion (US dollars) in sales annually. Three of them operate as retailers' cooperatives: Do It Best Corp, from Fort Wayne Indiana, True Value Company from Chicago Illinois and Ace Hardware from Oakbrook Illinois. Hardware store owners purchase stock in these suppliers and are "members" and "owners" as well as customers. A hardware store may choose to include the name of the cooperative in the advertised name of the store.

The fourth nationwide supplier is Orgill, Inc., a traditional wholesale organization that does not operate as a cooperative.

Hardware stores also purchase from a variety of regional wholesalers and specialty manufacturers. Some hardware stores operate rental businesses as part of the primary business, and rent for public use construction tools and/or party supplies. The major hardware cooperatives provide brand name rental advertising and support for hardware store owners including Just Ask Rental, Party Central, Grand Rental Station and Taylor Rental, all four of which are brands owned by the True Value Company.

Elwood Adams Hardware of Worcester, Massachusetts claims to be the oldest operating hardware store in the United States, having begun business in 1782.

Unique services in hardware stores
Part of the popularity of American hardware stores is the range of services they provide. Most retail outlets only sell goods, while some hardware stores custom-make or repair a large variety of household items. It is common for a hardware store in the U.S. to repair broken windows and screens, repair power equipment such as lawn mowers, re-key entry locks, make copies of house keys and car keys, re-wire lamps and vacuum cleaners, sharpen knives and cutting tools, make minor repairs to faucet and shower parts, repair kerosene heaters and cut and thread plumbing pipe to sketch.

Hardware industry trade association
The North American Retail Hardware Association (NRHA) is a membership organization that provides training and resources for hardware store owners and publishes a trade magazine in print and online.

Canada
Home Hardware, Rona, Canac, BMR Group and Réno-Dépôt are Canadian hardware retailers. Aikenhead's Hardware became the Canadian unit of The Home Depot in 1994. Canadian Tire, Central, Kent Building Supplies, Lowe's and many smaller chains also sell hardware in Canada.

United Kingdom

In the United Kingdom, hardware stores can be known as ironmongers, DIY stores and home improvement stores.  British retail chains include B&Q, Homebase, and Wickes. Australian hardware chain Bunnings opened their first shop in St Albans in February 2017 and planned to convert several other Homebase shops into pilot Bunnings shops after acquiring them in February 2016.

Europe and the Middle East

European-based stores include:

 Arabesque / BudMax / Mathaus
 Bauhaus
 Biltema
 Brico
 Brico Dépôt
 Bricorama
 Bricostore
 Castorama
 Clas Ohlson
 Dedeman
 EpiCentre K
 Formido
 Gamma
 Hornbach
 Hubo Belgium
 Hubo Netherlands
 Karwei
 Leroy Merlin
 Mr. Bricolage
 Obi
 Praktiker
 Praxis
 SACO Hardware

India
In India hardware stores are mostly small businesses, and as such there are no major store chains that carry a large selection of products. In Urban and rural India, stores don't have ample floor space compared to their western counterparts, however they usually are well stocked with a wide variety of items. Indian hardware stores are similar to hardware stores around the world, offering products from several categories such as plumbing, machinery, household, gardening, manufacturing, cobbler, carpenter, and electrical. Commonly found items in a typical Indian hardware store include: PVC pipes, taps, paints, hand pump, nut, bolts, pots, broom, wiper, lock, bulb and lights, wires, paint, drums, knife, bottle, jars, plastic, rubber, thread, rope, bucket, jug, glass, tub, screw, hammer, hanger, net and door lockers.

China
Most hardware stores in China, whether in the city or rural areas, are small, family-owned, non-franchise companies. They provide similar products to Western hardware stores, including plumbing and electrical supplies, tools, and some housewares. Unlike the West, they do not normally carry lumber, fishing supplies, gardening products, or boating supplies. Some rural hardware stores do supply animal feed, such as chicken feed.

Common to most non-Western countries, China has specialty hardware stores, dedicated to selling products in a particular category. These stores are usually grouped together in a district, often alongside groups of other specialty hardware stores, which are also grouped together. Examples are groups of stores that specialize in:
Chain, carrying different sizes of chain, couplings, lifting hooks, cutters, etc.
Generators and compressors, selling parts, hoses, plus products and tools related the maintenance and repair of generators and compressors.
Tubing and metal rods, carrying products of various sizes and materials.
Large power tools, with accessories.
Electrical wire and wire rope, also selling electrical switches, fuse boxes, and wire rope sockets, clamps, and thimbles.

Australia and New Zealand 

In Australia hardware stores specialise in Home Décor and include large selections of paint. There are three major hardware companies in Australia: Bunnings Warehouse, Mitre 10, and Danks (Home Timber & Hardware). Danks is a retailers' co-operative and has many banners which store owners trade under.

Since the acquisition of Bunnings by Wesfarmers in 1994, the big-box store concept has changed how new hardware stores are built. In 2004, Mitre 10 built its first supercentre Mitre 10 "MEGA" with an average store size of 13,500 m2. These were later either closed or turned into large-concept Mitre 10 stores. In 2011 Masters Home Improvement entered the market and has since opened more than 49 stores, with an average footprint of 13,500 m2. Masters Home Improvement, which was the second-largest hardware chain in Australia, closed in December 2016.

Bunnings also operates in New Zealand, competing against Mitre 10 New Zealand and Hammer Hardware. The Australian Bunnings Warehouse and Mitre 10 Mega format have also been introduced to New Zealand.

See also
 American Hardware Manufacturers Association
 National Hardware Show
 DIY Week

References

External links
 

 
 
Retailers by type of merchandise sold